Schrafft's was a chain of high-volume moderately priced New York restaurants connected to the Schrafft's food and candy business of Boston. The dining rooms, which had tablecloths at dinner time, and later had separate standing bar areas, were supplemented by fountain service lunch counters, separate rooms in which were displayed for sale Schrafft's branded candy and ice cream, and various items such as wrapped gift baskets of fruit, candy and stuffed toys.

History
Schrafft's was founded by William G. Schrafft as a candy manufacturer in Boston but over time the company became a well-known restaurant chain as well. In 1898 Frank G. Shattuck, a salesman for the Schrafft company from upstate New York, opened a candy store at Broadway and West 36th Street in Manhattan, New York City. His sister, Jane Shattuck, was largely responsible for the introduction of light lunches into the stores.

The first location to serve food was the Syracuse store in 1906. By 1909 Jane introduced meals to the second New York City Schrafft's, at 54 West 23rd Street in the heart of the Ladies' Mile shopping district. By 1927 there were 25 units, mostly in New York, and by 1928 Schrafft's revenue from lunch sales was  a month.

Schrafft's was known for an air of gentility typical of the upper-middle-class home. Cooks, supervisors, and even some executives were women. Menus of the 1920s and 1930s included many salads, more desserts than entrees, and vegetable selections such as creamed cauliflower and fried eggplant.

Rent cuts in The Depression encouraged chain expansion, and by 1937 there were 43 Schrafft's, primarily in metropolitan New York City, but a few in Boston and Philadelphia.  The 1939 WPA Guide to New York City said Schrafft's had 38 locations in the metropolitan area, serving American home food. At its peak there were about 50 units in greater New York.

Pet made a renewed effort to renovate Schrafft's image, attract men with men-only sections of the restaurants, and diversify by opening a chain of Schrafft's motels.

In the 1970s, however, the chain dwindled with most restaurant locations closing within the decade. In 1981 the candy company ceased operations while the few restaurants remaining were in various hands.

in 2019, James Byrne, a Godson of the Shattucks, the founding family of Schrafft's Restaurants, announced the return of the brand with plans to open brick-and-mortar retail.

References
Notes

Bibliography
 
Slomanson, Joan Kanel (2006) When Everybody Ate at Schrafft's: Memories, Pictures, and Recipes from a Very Special Restaurant Empire. Fort Lee, New Jersey: Barricade Books. 

Regional restaurant chains in the United States
Restaurants in New York (state)
Restaurants established in 1898
American companies established in 1898
1898 establishments in New York (state)